Karim El Idrissi (born 26 November 1977 in Auxerre) is a retired French football player of Moroccan origin, who last plays for AJ Auxerre.

Notes

1977 births
Living people
French footballers
Association football defenders
AJ Auxerre players
French sportspeople of Moroccan descent
Sportspeople from Auxerre
Footballers from Bourgogne-Franche-Comté